Kaysersberg Vignoble is a commune in the Haut-Rhin department of northeastern France. The municipality was established on 1 January 2016 and consists of the former communes of Kaysersberg, Kientzheim and Sigolsheim. Kaysersberg Vignoble lies in the canton of Sainte-Marie-aux-Mines, which itself is a subdivision of the Colmar-Ribeauvillé arrondissement.

Education
Schools in the commune include:
 Collège Albert Schweitzer (junior high school located in Kaysersberg)
 École maternelle Bristel (nursery school located in  Kaysersberg)
 École maternelle Alspach (nursery school located in  Kaysersberg)
 École maternelle et élémentaire Les Crecelles (nursery and primary school located in Kientzheim)
 École maternelle et élémentaire Les Hirondelles (nursery and primary school located in Sigolsheim)
 Groupe Scolaire Jean Geiler (nursery and primary school located in Kaysersberg)

The Lycée Seijo, was a Japanese boarding school, which operated in Kientzheim from 1986 to 2005. The European Centre for Japanese Studies in Alsace (CEEJA,  Aruzasu Ōshū Nihongaku Kenkyūsho) is now located on the site of the former school.

Tourism
As the name suggests the commune is surrounded by vineyards where Alsace wine of excellent quality is produced. The commune lies on the Route des Vins d'Alsace.

There are a number of castles which are all within walking distance of each other: the ruin of Kaysersberg Castle in Kaysersberg, Chateau des Ifs, Château de Lupfen-Schwendi and Château de Reichenstein in Kientzheim.  The ruin of Château du Wineck in Katzenthal is also within walking distance.

Notable people

 Anthony Bourdain, celebrity chef, author, and travel documentarian, died here while filming a TV show
 Johann Geiler von Kaisersberg (known locally as Jean Geiler), priest and theologian, was raised in Kaysersberg
 Roger Hassenforder, former cyclist who operated a restaurant in Kaysersberg
 Anthony Kohlmann, Jesuit priest known for his role in the formation of the Diocese of New York, was born in Kaysersberg
 Blessed Anicet Kopliński (born Anicet Adalbert Koplin), German priest who worked mostly in Poland, became a Capuchin friar (Père Anicet) in Sigolsheim. One of the 108 Martyrs of World War II.
 Andreas Räss, bishop of Strasbourg, was born in Sigolsheim
 Albert Schweitzer, theologian, musician, philosopher, and physician, was born in Kaysersberg
 Lazarus von Schwendi, Austrian military commander, lived in Kientzheim
 Hervé This, inventor of molecular gastronomy, president of l'Association des Amis des Orgues Valentin Rinkenbach de Kientzheim
 Matthäus Zell, Lutheran pastor, was born in Kaysersberg

See also
Communes of the Haut-Rhin department

References

External links
 Kaysersberg Vignoble 

Communes of Haut-Rhin